The Williams FW35 was a Formula One racing car designed and built by the Williams team for use in the 2013 Formula One season. It was driven by Pastor Maldonado and 2011 GP3 Series champion Valtteri Bottas in his Formula One debut. The car was launched on 19 February at the Circuit de Catalunya in Barcelona, Spain, with the team using an interim version of the FW34 for the first test in Jerez de la Frontera. This was also the team's last season using a Renault engine before a new long term deal with Mercedes was activated for 2014.

After an impressive 2012, which saw the team pick up their first win since 2004 at the Spanish Grand Prix, 2013 was a massive disaster for the team, similar to 2011. The team was eliminated in Q1 mostly along with Marussia and Caterham, and failed to score a point until Hungary, when Maldonado finished 10th. Bottas, on the other hand, qualified an impressive third in Canada, but could only finish 14th, and he failed to score a point until Austin, when he finished 8th. The team finished 9th in the Constructors’ Championship, with 5 points, their equal-worst season.

Competition history
The FW35 was faced with a difficult debut when the Fédération Internationale de l'Automobile declared its exhaust system to be illegal the day the car was launched, forcing the team to revise design. Despite this setback, Pastor Maldonado and Valtteri Bottas declared themselves to be happy with the development of the car after completing its winter testing programme.

However, the scheduled updates that the team introduced for the first race in Australia did not work as planned, with Maldonado declaring the car to be "undriveable", and that the team had set themselves back three years, though he did acknowledge that his struggles with the car may have been down to a combination of the characteristics of the Melbourne Grand Prix Circuit and the team's inability to find a proper car setup for the extreme conditions experienced over the race weekend. Nevertheless, the team made the decision to revert the FW35 back to its launch specification before the race.

Complete Formula One results
(key) (results in bold indicate pole position; results in italics indicate fastest lap)

References

External links

 The official Williams F1 website 

Williams Formula One cars